Silayugathile Sthreekal is a 1996 Indian Malayalam film, directed by RS Suresh.

Cast

References

External links
 

1996 films
1990s Malayalam-language films